Ardeadoris egretta, the heron ardeadoris, is a species of sea slug, a dorid nudibranch, a shell-less marine gastropod mollusc in the family Chromodorididae. It is the type species of the genus Ardeadoris.

Description

Distribution
It was described from Escape Reef and other sites on the Great Barrier Reef, Australia. It occurs in the Indian Ocean and the tropical Western Pacific in Malaysia, Indonesia and the Solomon Islands.

References

External links
 

Chromodorididae
Gastropods described in 1984